Vivaldi Residences may refer to
Vivaldi Residences Cubao, a residential building in Quezon City
Vivaldi Residences Davao, a residential building in Davao City